The group stage of the 2004–05 UEFA Cup is the second stage of the competition proper. Group stage matches began on 21 October 2004 and concluded on 16 December 2004. The top three teams in each group progressed to the Round of 32, to be joined by the eight third-place finishers from the Champions League group stage.

Seeding structure
The 40 teams were divided into five pots. Pot 1 comprised the top eight clubs in the team ranking. Pot 2 contained the following eight clubs in the rankings and likewise for Pots 3, 4 and 5. Each group contained one team from each pot. A team's seeding was determined by the UEFA coefficients.

Groups

Group A

Group B

Group C

Group D

Group E

Group F

Group G

Group H

References

group stage
2004-05